Llangeinor railway station served the village of Llangeinor, in the historical county of Glamorgan, Wales, from 1886 to 1953 on the Garw Valley Railway.

History 
The station was opened on 25 October 1886 by the Great Western Railway. It closed on 1 January 1917 but reopened on 1 January 1919, before closing permanently on 9 February 1953. The track still exists and adjacent is a cycle path that runs between Bryngarw Country Park and Blaengarw.

References

External links 

Disused railway stations in Bridgend County Borough
Former Great Western Railway stations
Railway stations in Great Britain opened in 1886
Railway stations in Great Britain closed in 1917
Railway stations in Great Britain opened in 1919
Railway stations in Great Britain closed in 1953
1886 establishments in Wales
1953 disestablishments in Wales